Farbus is a commune in the Pas-de-Calais department in the Hauts-de-France region of France. It is located 7 kilometres from the Canadian National Vimy Memorial dedicated to the Battle of Vimy Ridge (part of the Battle of Arras) and the missing First World War Canadian soldiers with no known grave; the Memorial is also the site of two Canadian cemeteries.

Geography

Population

Places of interest
 The church of St. Ranulphe, rebuilt after World War I
 The nearby Canadian National Vimy Memorial

See also
Communes of the Pas-de-Calais department

References

Communes of Pas-de-Calais